Smal may refer to:

People
  (1927-2001), Dutch musician
 Georges Smal (1928–1988), Belgian writer
 Gert Smal (born 1961), South African rugby player
 Gijs Smal (born 1997), Dutch football player
  (born 1939), Belgian politician; a member of the Walloon Parliament from 2004 to 2009
 Nataliya Smal (born 1983), Ukrainian judoka and sambist
 Roman Smal-Stocki (1893–1969), Ukrainian diplomat
 Sergey Smal (born 1968), Belarusian wrestler
 Stepan Smal-Stotsky, Ukrainian linguist and academician

Places

Other
 Smal or Samael, archangel

See also
 Small (disambiguation)